Harvest Moon is the 19th studio album by Canadian musician Neil Young, released on November 2, 1992. Many of its backing musicians also appeared on Young's 1972 album Harvest.

Recordings
Recovering from a case of tinnitus that had come about after the recording of Ragged Glory (1990) and its subsequent tour (which produced the 1991 albums Weld and Arc), Young returned to the studio with Ben Keith, picking up the acoustic guitar, piano and banjo that had dominated albums such as Harvest, Comes a Time and Old Ways. 1970s-era analogue equipment was used instead of digital recording to achieve a "warmer" feel, though the album was in fact recorded on Sony PCM 16/44.1kHz digital.

The subsequent 1992 tour was recorded and ultimately released on the 2009 Dreamin' Man live album, containing Young's solo renditions of all Harvest Moon tracks in a different order.

Reception
Music website Classic Rock Review named Harvest Moon its album of the year for 1992. It earned the 1994 Juno Award for album of the year.  Matthew Greenwald of AllMusic described the melody of the title track as "positively gorgeous". The album continued Young's commercial and critical resurgence following Freedom and Ragged Glory, eventually outselling both of those records. The song "Harvest Moon" topped the AARP's list of "16 Songs Everyone Over 50 Should Own."

Track listing
All tracks written by Neil Young.

Personnel 
 Neil Young – vocals, guitars, harmonica, banjo guitar, piano, pump organ, vibraphone
The Stray Gators
 Ben Keith – pedal steel guitar, Dobro, bass marimba, backing vocals
 Spooner Oldham – piano, pump organ, keyboards
 Tim Drummond – bass guitar, marimba, broom
 Kenny Buttrey – drums
Additional personnel
 Larry Cragg – backing vocals on "War of Man"
 Nicolette Larson – backing vocals on "You and Me", "War of Man", "Such a Woman", "Old King", "Dreamin' Man" and "Natural Beauty"
 Linda Ronstadt – backing vocals on "Unknown Legend", "From Hank to Hendrix", "Harvest Moon", "War of Man" and "One of These Days"
 James Taylor – backing vocals on "From Hank to Hendrix", "War of Man" and "One of These Days"
 Astrid Young – backing vocals on "War of Man", "Such a Woman" and "Dreamin' Man"
 Jack Nitzsche – string arrangement on "Such a Woman"
 Suzie Katayama – conductor on "Such a Woman"
 Maria Newman – concertmaster on "Such a Woman"
 Maria Newman, Israel Baker, Betty Byers, Berg Garabedian, Harris Goldman, Robin Lorentz, Cindy McGurty, Haim Shtrum – violins on "Such a Woman"
 Valerie Dimond, Matt Funes, Rick Gerding, Carrie Prescott, David Stenske, Adriana Zoppo – violas on "Such a Woman"
 Larry Corbett, Ericka Duke, Greg Gottlieb, David Shamban – cellos on "Such a Woman"

Charts

Weekly charts

Year-end charts

Certifications

Covers
Jazz singer Cassandra Wilson recorded a rendition of "Harvest Moon" for her 1995 album New Moon Daughter

American singers Ann Wilson and Alison Krauss recorded a cover of "War of Man" for Wilson's 2007 album Hope & Glory.

Los Angeles electronic production duo Poolside recorded a cover of "Harvest Moon" for their 2012 album Pacific Standard Time

American folk duo Shovels & Rope recorded "Unknown Legend" with Shakey Graves in 2015.

Los Angeles indie rock band Lord Huron recorded a cover of "Harvest Moon" in 2018 for a Spotify Singles session.

Jazz guitarist Bill Frisell recorded a version of "One of These Days" on his 1997 album Nashville.

Tunde Adebimpe, the lead singer of TV on The Radio, performs an acapella version of Unknown Legend in the Jonathan Demme film Rachel Getting Married.

See also 
 Dreamin' Man Live '92, a live version of Harvest Moon, recorded on tour in 1992 and released in 2009

References

Neil Young albums
1992 albums
Reprise Records albums
Albums produced by Neil Young
Albums produced by Ben Keith
Juno Award for Album of the Year albums
Works about the Moon